Pakistan Times (1947–1996) was a Pakistani newspaper, established by Mian Itikharuddin and Faiz Ahmed Faiz through the leftist Progressive Papers Limited. It was based in Lahore, Pakistan.

Historical background 
Pakistan Times was owned and operated by Mian Iftikharuddin, a Punjabi politician formerly of the Indian National Congress but of All-India Muslim League after 1946. The newspaper started publication on 4 February 1947. Its editor-in-chief in the 1940s was the communist poet Faiz Ahmed Faiz. After his arrest in 1951 in connection with the Rawalpindi Conspiracy Case, Mazhar Ali Khan served as the editor-in-chief. The Pakistan Times continued to be an influential newspaper in the 1950s, with its disparaging criticism of the government in participating in the US-sponsored military alliances.

During the military regime of Ayub Khan, rigorous pre-censorship was imposed on the press including the Pakistan Times. In April 1959, the regime took over the Progressive Papers Limited under the Pakistan Security Act.

In 1964, the National Press Trust was set up by the Ayub government as a front organisation for managing the newspapers taken over by the government including the Pakistan Times.
In the 1980s, ten journalists and management staff of the Pakistan Times were dismissed by the Zia ul-Haq regime for their connections to the Movement for the Restoration of Democracy and for signing an appeal for "Peace in Sindh" movement.

The National Press Trust was privatized in 1996. The same year, the Pakistan Times was closed down.

References

Bibliography
 
 
 

English-language newspapers published in Pakistan
Mass media in Lahore
1947 establishments in Pakistan
Publications established in 1947
Pakistan Movement